Laya Joneidi is an Iranian lawyer and associate professor of private law at University of Tehran, who served as the vice president for legal affairs in the administration of President Hassan Rouhani.

From 2002 to 2003, she worked on research "A Comparative Study of Commercial Arbitration in Islamic Law and Other Major Contemporary Legal Systems" at Harvard Law School.

Views 
Joneydi maintains that procedural justice is "inquisitorial and accusatorial". She believes "there is no hindrance that prevents women from serving in judicial posts in Islam".

References

External links
 Academic webpage
 Joneydi & Associates International Law Firm

Living people
Female vice presidents of Iran
Vice Presidents of Iran for Legal Affairs
University of Tehran alumni
Academic staff of the University of Tehran
Iranian women lawyers
Harvard Law School alumni
Women vice presidents
1968 births
21st-century Iranian women politicians
21st-century Iranian politicians